Arthur Matson "Archie" Taylor (born 7 November 1939) is an English former footballer.

Career
Taylor started his career with Doncaster Rovers as an amateur.

Notes

1939 births
Living people
English footballers
Association football wingers
Doncaster Rovers F.C. players
Bristol City F.C. players
Barnsley F.C. players
Hull City A.F.C. players
Halifax Town A.F.C. players
Bradford City A.F.C. players
York City F.C. players